Stone Bridge High School is a public secondary school in Ashburn, a community in Loudoun County, Virginia.

The school is part of Loudoun County Public Schools. Newsweek ranked Stone Bridge the #4 high school in Virginia and the #1 high school in Loudoun County in 2014.



History
Stone Bridge opened in 2000. The school derives its name from the stone Broad Run Bridge.

In 2002, most of Stone Bridge's Leesburg student body was moved to Heritage High School, but some additional students from Broad Run were moved to Stone Bridge, dropping enrollment to roughly 1,400 students in the 2002–2003 school year.
However, by the 2004–2005 school year, the student body went up to nearly 1,900 students, the largest student body in Loudoun County.

2021 sexual assault

On May 28, 2021, a male teenager was accused of sexually assaulting a female student in a girls' restroom at Stone Bridge High School in Ashburn. Following a weeks-long investigation by the Loudoun County Sheriff's Office, a 14-year-old male was arrested on July 8, 2021, and charged with two counts of forcible sodomy. On October 6, 2021, the same male teenager, now aged 15, was accused of sexually assaulting a female student in an empty classroom at Broad Run High School. The male student was arrested the following day and charged with sexual battery and abduction of a fellow student. On October 25, 2021, the suspect was found guilty on all charges for the May 28 assault. On November 15, 2021, the suspect pleaded no contest to a felony charge of abduction and a misdemeanor count of sexual battery for the October 6 assault. In January 2022, the suspect was found guilty on all four charges and was sentenced to complete a "residential program in a locked-down facility" and placed on supervised probation until he turned 18, and ordered to register as a sex offender in Virginia. Later that month, Brooks decided against placing the perpetrator on the sex offender registry, due to the offender's young age and data indicating that teenagers placed on the registry go on to have higher recidivism rates.

Extracurricular activities

The debate program won the AA state title in 2005, and the AAA state title in 2006.

Stone Bridge's chapter of Future Business Leaders of America (FBLA) has been named as an Honor Chapter by the Virginia FBLA since it was chartered in 2002. In 2006, the chapter was recognized with its first award from the National FBLA organization; receiving the Business Achievement Award.

Athletics

Stone Bridge has a long-standing rivalry with nearby Broad Run High School, with the annual football game between the two schools being called the "Battle of the 'Burn".

The school's mascot and colors were established in 1999 after a student referendum at Broad Run High School, Loudoun County High School, and Harper Park Middle School.

Stone Bridge has won 17 state titles in the following sports:
Four for cheerleading (AA champion in 2004; AAA champion in 2005, 2006, and 2008)
Eight NVSHL titles for ice hockey in 2001–2002, 2002–2003, 2007–2008, 2010–2011, 2011–2012, 2014–2015, 2015–16, and 2016–17
One AA title for girls soccer in 2005
Three AAA title for football (Division 5) in 2007, Spring 2021 (season delayed due to COVID-19 pandemic), Fall 2021
One AAA title for girls soccer in 2010

The Bulldogs have been state runners-up thirteen times, which are:
One in AA cheerleading in the 2002 season, one in AAA in the 2009 season, and again in 5A in the 2014 season.
Seven in AAA Division 5 football in 2005, 2009, 2010, 2012, 2015, 2016, and 2018.
Two in AAA softball in 2006 and 2013
One in AAA girls volleyball in 2010

Stone Bridge has also won three awards for sportsmanship, which are:
Two for the Wachovia Ethics and Integrity Award (2001–2002 and 2004–2005)
One in AA Girls Volleyball in 2003–2004

State championships

{| class="wikitable collapsible collapsed" width=650px
|+
! colspan="7" style="text-align:center;" bgcolor=""|Cheerleading State Championships
|-
!align=center| Year
! colspan="2" style="text-align:center;"| Winning Team
! colspan="2" style="text-align:center;"| Runner-Up
!align=center| Class
|-
|2003
| William Byrd
| 266.50
| Stone Bridge
| 258.50
| AA
|-
|2004
| Stone Bridge
| 268.00
| William Byrd
| 261.00
| AA
|-
|2005
| Stone Bridge
| 260.00
| Lake Braddock
| 245.00
| AAA
|-
|2006
| Stone Bridge
| 266.00
| J.R. Tucker
| 265.00
| AAA
|-
|2008
| Stone Bridge
| 259.50
| Fairfax
| 252.00
| AAA
|-
|2009
| Fairfax
| 261.50
| Stone Bridge
| 259.50
| AAA
|-
|2014
|Hickory
|274.00
|Stone Bridge
|264.50
|5A
|}
{| class="wikitable collapsible collapsed" width=650px
|+
! colspan="7" style="text-align:center;" bgcolor|Football State Championship Games
|-
!align=center| Year
! colspan="2" style="text-align:center;"| Winning Team
! colspan="2" style="text-align:center;"| Losing Team
!align=center| Class
|-
|2005
| Hampton
| 15
| Stone Bridge
| 8
| AAA Div. 5
|-
|2007
| Stone Bridge
| 38
| Potomac
| 0
| AAA Div. 5
|-
|2009
| Phoebus
| 15
| Stone Bridge
| 10
| AAA Div. 5
|-
|2010
| Phoebus
| 36
| Stone Bridge
| 17
| AAA Div. 5
|}
{| class="wikitable collapsible collapsed" width=650px
|+
! colspan="7" style="text-align:center;" bgcolor=""|Girls Soccer State Championship Games
|-
!align=center| Year
! colspan="2" style="text-align:center;"| Winning Team
! colspan="2" style="text-align:center;"| Losing Team
!align=center| Class
|-
|2005
| Stone Bridge
| 3
| Courtland
| 0
| AA
|-
|2010
| Stone Bridge
| 4
| Cosby
| 0
| AAA
|}
{| class="wikitable collapsible collapsed" width=650px
|+
! colspan="7" style="text-align:center;" bgcolor=""|Softball State Championship Game
|-
!align=center| Year
! colspan="2" style="text-align:center;"| Winning Team
! colspan="2" style="text-align:center;"| Losing Team
!align=center| Class
|-
|2006
| Hanover
| 3
| Stone Bridge
| 0
| AAA
|}

Notable alumni
Jonathan Allen, defensive end for the Washington Commanders: graduated in 2013.
J.B. Bukauskas, baseball pitcher for the Arizona Diamondbacks: graduated in 2014.
Adam Comrie, defensiveman for the Worcester Sharks of the American Hockey League whilst under contract to the San Jose Sharks of the National Hockey League.
Aaron Crawford, defensive end for the Baltimore Ravens: graduated in 2015.
Nate Davis, offensive lineman for the Tennessee Titans: graduated in 2014.
Ryan Ellis, racecar driver in NASCAR Xfinity Series: graduated in 2008; attended George Mason University from 2009 to 2012. 
Emily Fox, American soccer player for the North Carolina Tar Heels, and first overall pick in the 2021 NWSL Draft: graduated in 2017.
Zach Thompson, former NFL defensive end: graduated in 2009.
Ed Wang, former NFL offensive lineman: graduated in 2005.
Jennifer Yu, chess player, Woman Grandmaster, and 2-time U.S. Women's Chess Champion: graduated in 2020.

External links
Gameday: Covers in depth on all sports in Loudoun County, including Stone Bridge High School.
VHSL-Reference
http://www.publicschoolreview.com/school_ov/school_id/84964
http://www.maxpreps.com/athletes/pvUkH_xP-EyWP2R-qaIO-g/football-fall-10/profile-mike-ghanem.htm

References

Northern Virginia Scholastic Hockey League teams
Educational institutions established in 2000
Schools in Loudoun County, Virginia
Public high schools in Virginia
2000 establishments in Virginia